The 2020–21 Basketball Cup of Serbia is the 15th season of the Serbian 2nd-tier men's cup tournament.

The draw was held on 11 December 2020. In the final, Vojvodina won over Radnički Kragujevac.

Bracket
Source: SrbijaSport

Quarterfinals
All times are local UTC+1.

Vojvodina v Napredak JKP

The match was not played, and Napredak JKP forfeited 0–20.

Hercegovac v OKK Beograd

Fair Play v Radnički Kragujevac

Originally to be scheduled to 23 December, it was postponed and re-scheduled to 30 December.

Klik v Mladost Zemun

Semifinals
All times are local UTC+1.

Vojvodina v OKK Beograd

Originally to be scheduled to 13 January 2021, it was postponed and re-scheduled to 20 January.

Radnički Kragujevac v Mladost Zemun

Final

See also 
 2020–21 Radivoj Korać Cup
 2020–21 Basketball League of Serbia

References

External links 
 

Basketball Cup of Serbia
Cup